Blindspott is the self-titled debut album by the New Zealand nu metal group. The band licensed its release through EMI New Zealand. The album went platinum in New Zealand in its first week of release. It is now triple-platinum.

Track listing

Charts

Weekly charts

Year-end charts

Certifications

References

2003 debut albums
EMI Records albums
Blindspott albums